BRICSat-2 (Ballistically Reinforced Communication Satellite 2), or USNAP1, was an experimental amateur radio satellite from the United States Naval Academy that was developed in collaboration with George Washington University. BRICSat-2 was the successor to BRICSat-P. AMSAT North America's OSCAR number administrator assigned number 103 to this satellite; in the amateur radio community it was therefore called Navy-OSCAR 103, short NO-103.

Mission
BRICSat-2 was launched on June 25, 2019 with a Falcon Heavy from Kennedy Space Center, Florida, United States, as part of Mission STP-2 (Space Test Program 2) as one of 24 satellites.

Frequencies
 145.825 MHz - Uplink APRS digital repeater, 1200 bd
 145.825 MHz - Downlink APRS digital repeater
 437.605 MHz - Telemetry, 9600 bd (callsign USNAP14)

See also

 OSCAR

References

External links
 BRICSAT-2 - The first APRS Satelilte with Thrusters. ARPS

Amateur radio satellites
Spacecraft launched in 2019
Spacecraft which reentered in 2022
CubeSats